Gayane Olegovna Umerova (born on April 22, 1985, Tashkent) is an art critic, public figure of culture and art of Uzbekistan, curator.

Executive Director of the Art and Culture Development Foundation under the Cabinet of Ministers of the Republic of Uzbekistan, Secretary General of the National Commission of Uzbekistan on UNESCO Affairs under the Cabinet of Ministers (since 2020).

Biography
In 2004 she graduated from the School of Integrated Arts (West Yorkshire), in 2008 she graduated from Westminster International University with a degree in Business Management, in 2009 the Central Saint Martins College of Arts (London, UK) with a degree in "Culture, criticism and curation".

Has a MA in Contemporary Arts and Art Business from the University of Manchester (Manchester, UK, 2012) and at Institute of Art of Sotheby's Auction House (London, UK, 2011). Since 2017, she has been a researcher at the Department of Politics and International Relations at the University of Oxford (UK), in cultural diplomacy, foreign cultural policy.

In 2008-2017 she worked as a specialist, leading specialist of the Department of Exhibitions and Funds of the Fine Arts Gallery of Uzbekistan.

In 2011 she curated the 6th Tashkent International Biennale of Contemporary Arts (Uzbekistan).

In 2015 in collaboration with the British Council, she curated the exhibition “Henry Moore: Master of Graphics” at the State Museum of Art of Uzbekistan including organising an educational program as part of the project. Umerova's collaboration with the British Council continued until 2016 when the Gallery of Fine Arts of Uzbekistan hosted “The New Past: British Contemporary Arts” project showcasing the development of contemporary British art over the past 20 years.

As a result of her cooperation with the Christie's Auction House the first auction of contemporary Uzbek art was held in May 2012 at the Savitsky Museum, Nukus. In 2013 and 2014 she was a consultant for a series of auction exhibitions of contemporary art encompassing the countries from Central Asia and the Caucasus “At the Crossroads: Contemporary Art from Caucasus and Central Asia” at Sotheby's Auction House in London.

In 2016 the English-language portal “The Culture Trip” included her in the list of “8 most influential women in Central Asian and Caucasian art”. In 2022 she has been listed in the Cosmopolitan Russia list of 30 media and influential women from the CIS countries. Married with two children.

In 2021 she became a Commissioner of the first National Pavilion of Uzbekistan at the 17th Venice Architecture Biennale, and in 2022 the first National Pavilion of Uzbekistan at the 59th Venice Art Biennale.

Activities in the Foundation
Since 2017 she has been working at the Art and Culture Development Foundation of Uzbekistan whose task is to promote nationwide cultural processes in the country and advance Uzbekistan’s positions on the international art scene. From May to November 2017 she held the position of the head of the Foundation's budget management department, in November 2017 she was appointed as Deputy Executive Director, since 2020 she serves as an Executive Director of the Foundation.

In 2020 the press service of the State Committee for Tourism of Uzbekistan reported that by the assignment of the President and the Government of Ms. Umerova “became in charge of handling of implementation of major international projects in the field of arts: organizing exhibitions of Uzbekistan at the Louvre Museum and in Berlin [at the James Simon Gallery] in 2022, reconstruction of the State Museum Arts of Uzbekistan, creation of a modern Restoration Center of Uzbekistan, opening of the Great Silk Road Museum in Samarkand and arranging of Samarkand Half Marathon”.

She is a curator of large-scale architectural projects in Uzbekistan, including the construction of a new building of the State Museum of Arts of Uzbekistan designed by the architect, Pritzker Architecture Prize winner Tadao Ando, creation of the Center for Contemporary Art in Tashkent in collaboration with architecture bureau Studio KO as well as opening of Art-Residences. In addition to creation of the above-mentioned Restoration Research Center, she oversees the opening of the French Cultural Center designed by the architecture bureau Grace as well as reconstruction of the knyaz Nikolay Romanov’s Palace in Tashkent and the State Children’s Library.

Exhibition projects
 2008: curator of Gerhard Richter exhibition, Fine Arts Gallery of Uzbekistan
 2009: curator Günther Uecker exhibitions, Gallery of Fine Arts of Uzbekistan
 2009: Coordinator of educational programs – 5th Tashkent International Contemporary Arts Biennale
 2011: Curator – 6th Tashkent International Contemporary Arts Biennale
 2012: curator of a large-scale Hovhannes Tatevosyan exhibition
 2013 and 2014: Consultant of exhibition series “At the Crossroads: Contemporary Art form Caucasus and Central Asia” at Sotheby’s London.
 2015: curator of “Henry Moore: Master of Graphics” exhibition at the State Museum of Arts of Uzbekistan.
 2016: coordinator of “New Past: Contemporary UK Arts” exhibition [10], Fine Arts Gallery of Uzbekistan
 2021: Commissioner of the 1st National Pavilion of Uzbekistan “Mahalla: Urban Rural Living” at the 17th Venice Architecture Biennale.
 2022: commissioner of 1st National Pavilion of Uzbekistan “Dixit Algorizmi: The Garden of Knowledge at the 59th Venice Art Biennale.

Awards
 2013: Prize of the Union of Artists of the Artistic Confederation of the CIS countries for the project “Observations on the Invisible World” which explores the Islamic ornamental system in the art of Central Asia.
 Awarded with a commemorative badge on the occasion of the 30th anniversary of the Republic of Uzbekistan.

References 

Uzbekistani women
Uzbekistani art
Art curators
1985 births
Living people